Arthonia didyma is a species of lichen belonging to the family Arthoniaceae. It is native to Eurasia and North America.

References

Arthoniomycetes
Lichen species
Taxa named by Gustav Wilhelm Körber
Lichens described in 1853